By the Lake is a two-part 1969 Soviet film directed by Sergei Gerasimov. In 1971 the USSR State Prize for this film  was awarded to Sergei Gerasimov, cinematographer Vladimir Rapoport, art director Pyotr Galadzhev, and the group of leading actors: Oleg Zhakov, Vasily Shukshin, Natalya Belokhvostikova.

Plot
The film covers the time period of the first half of the 1960s.

On the shore of Lake Baikal construction of a pulp and paper mill is planned. Well-known scientist Professor Barmin and his daughter Lena start to fight to preserve the unique ecosystem of the lake. At the same time Lena Barmina's personal drama unfolds, when she falls in love with the married elderly plant director Vasily Chernykh. One of the main characters in the film was based on the scientist Mikhail Kozhov, an expert on the fauna of Lake Baikal.

Cast
 Oleg Zhakov as Barmin
 Vasily Shukshin as Chernykh
 Natalya Belokhvostikova as Lena Barmina
 Valentina Telichkina as Valya Korolkova
 Mikhail Nozhkin as Gennady Yakovlev
 Natalya Arinbasarova as Katya Olzoeva
 Nikolai Yeremenko Jr. as Alexey 
 Vadim Spiridonov as Konstantin Konovalov
 Yuriy Kuzmenkov as a passenger on a train
 Natalya Bondarchuk as a passenger on a train
 Nina Maslova as a girl in a drama production

External links

1969 films
Soviet drama films
1960s Russian-language films
Films set in the Soviet Union
Gorky Film Studio films
Films directed by Sergei Gerasimov